The Ellis C. Snodgrass Memorial Bridge is located in Yarmouth, Maine, United States. It spans a section of inner Casco Bay, connecting the mainland, at Drinkwater Point, to Cousins Island, at Sandy Point, hence it is also known as Cousins Island Bridge. It carries vehicular and pedestrian traffic of Cousins Street, and is the only means of access to and from Cousins Island, except by watercraft.

The bridge, which is named for its constructor Ellis C. Snodgrass, was built in 1955 and renovated in 1992.

As of 2016, an average of 2,240 vehicles crossed it daily.

References 

Bridges completed in 1955
Transportation in Yarmouth, Maine
Casco Bay
Bridges in Cumberland County, Maine
Buildings and structures in Yarmouth, Maine